Charl is an Afrikaans, English, and German masculine given name. Notable people with this name include the following:

Given name

Charl Bouwer, South African paralympic swimmer 
Charl Cilliers (writer) (born 1941), South African author and poet
Charl Crous (born 1990), South African swimmer
Charl Cyster, South African cricketer
Charl du Plessis (rugby union) (born 1987), South African rugby player 
Charl du Plessis (pianist) (born 1977), South African pianist
Charl du Toit (born 1993), South African Paralympic sprint athlete
Charl Langeveldt (born 1974), South African cricket coach and cricketer
Charl Malan (born 1989), English cricketer
Charl Mattheus (born 1965), South African ultramarathon athlete
Charl McLeod (born 1983), South African rugby player 
Charl Pietersen (born 1983), South African cricketer
Charl Pietersen (darts player) (born 1991), South African darts player
Charl Schwartzel (born 1984), South African golfer
Charl Van Den Berg, South African model and activist
Charl Willoughby (born 1974), South African cricketer

Middle name
Johan Charl Walters (1919–1993), South African Navy admiral

See also

Carl (name)
Chal (name)
Char (name)
Chara (given name)
Chara (surname)
Chard (name)
Chari (surname)
Charla (name)
Charle (name)
Charls
Charli (name)
Charlo (name)
Charly (name)
Charo (name)
Charyl
Charm (disambiguation)
Charr (disambiguation)
Chart (disambiguation)

Notes

Afrikaans-language given names
English masculine given names
German masculine given names